Giuseppe Lauricella (1867–1913) was an Italian mathematician who is remembered today for his contributions to analysis and the theory of elasticity.

Born in Agrigento (Sicily), he studied at the University of Pisa, where his professors included Luigi Bianchi, Ulisse Dini and Vito Volterra. He taught in secondary schools from 1895 to 1898, then became a professor at the University of Catania. He died in Catania at age 45 from scarlet fever which he contracted from one of his children.

In 1907 he also became a member of the Accademia dei Lincei. He was an Invited Speaker of the ICM in 1908 in Rome.

Contributions
 Lauricella hypergeometric series 
 Lauricella's theorem (regarding orthogonal functions)
 Sherman–Lauricella integral equation of elasticity

Notes

References

Tricomi: La matematica italiana 1800-1950, 1962 (entry on Lauricella)

1867 births
1913 deaths
People from Agrigento
Mathematicians from Sicily